Pevidém Sport Clube is a Portuguese sports club from Pevidém, Guimarães.

The men's football team plays in the Campeonato de Portugal.

References

Football clubs in Portugal
Association football clubs established in 1989
1989 establishments in Portugal